Virgil Griffith (born 1983), also known as Romanpoet, is an American programmer. He worked extensively on the Ethereum cryptocurrency platform, designed the Tor2web proxy along with Aaron Swartz, and created the Wikipedia indexing tool WikiScanner. He has published papers on artificial life and integrated information theory. Griffith was arrested in 2019, and in 2021 pleaded guilty to conspiring to violate U.S. laws relating to money laundering using cryptocurrency and sanctions related to North Korea. On April 12, 2022, Griffith was sentenced to 63 months imprisonment for assisting North Korea with evading sanctions and is currently in a federal low-security prison in Pennsylvania.

Life
Griffith was born in Birmingham, Alabama and grew up in nearby Tuscaloosa. He graduated from the Alabama School of Math and Science in 2002, and then attended the University of Alabama, studying cognitive science. He transferred to Indiana University in 2004, but returned to graduate cum laude from Alabama in August 2007. In 2008, he was a visiting researcher at the Santa Fe Institute. In 2014 Griffith received his Ph.D. from the California Institute of Technology under Christof Koch in computation and neural systems with funding from the U.S. Departments of Energy and Homeland Security. He has been a research scientist at the Ethereum Foundation since 2016. At the time of his arrest in 2019, Griffith was a resident of Singapore and was allegedly investigating the possibility of renouncing his US citizenship.

Computer career 
Griffith has given talks at the hacker conferences Interz0ne, PhreakNIC, and HOPE.

At Interz0ne 1 in 2002, he met Billy Hoffman, a Georgia Tech student, who had discovered a security flaw in the campus magnetic ID card system called "BuzzCard". He and Hoffman collaborated to study the flaw and attempted to give a talk about it at Interz0ne 2 in April 2003. A few hours before the presentation, he and Hoffman were served with a cease and desist order from corporate lawyers acting for Blackboard Inc. Two days later, it was followed by a lawsuit alleging that they had stolen trade secrets and violated both the Digital Millennium Copyright Act and the Economic Espionage Act. The lawsuit was settled later that year.

On August 14, 2007, Griffith released a software utility, WikiScanner, that tracked Wikipedia article edits from unregistered accounts back to their originating IP addresses and identified the corporations or organizations to which they belonged. Griffith described his mission in developing WikiScanner as "to create minor public-relations disasters for companies and organizations I dislike."

In 2008, together with Aaron Swartz, Griffith designed the Tor2web proxy. In 2016, he was fired from the Tor team for attempting to sell de-anonymized Tor2web traffic.

On Ethereum, Griffith writes Ethereum "is an unprecedented arena for playing cooperative games", and "enables powerful economic vehicles we don’t yet understand", by bringing cooperative game theory into new domains. As of 2019 Griffith's homepage stated that he worked for the Ethereum Foundation.

Prosecution
On November 28, 2019, Griffith was arrested by the Federal Bureau of Investigation for providing "highly technical information to North Korea, knowing that this information could be used to help North Korea launder money and evade sanctions". The charges stem from his unsanctioned participation in an April 2019 blockchain and cryptocurrency conference held in Pyongyang, North Korea. During and after the conference, Griffith was alleged to have discussed means through which North Korea could use cryptocurrency to evade economic sanctions. Upon Griffith's arrest, Ethereum co-founder Vitalik Buterin initiated an online campaign for his release which, according to one source, could not garner many supporters.

On September 28, 2021, Griffith pleaded guilty at a hearing in which he expressed remorse. He was sentenced on April 12, 2022, to 63 months in prison, with 10 months already considered time served from his pre-trial detention.
 As of July 2022 he is in FCI Allenwood Low, a low-security federal prison in Pennsylvania.

Writing 
 Virgil Griffith, Markus Jakobsson, 2005. Messin' with Texas: Deriving Mother's Maiden Names Using Public Records. .
 Virgil Griffith, Larry S. Yaeger, 2005, MIT Press. Ideal Free Distribution in Agents with Evolved Neural Architectures. Indiana University School of Informatics and Department of Cognitive Science.
 Griffith is listed as one of the contributors (as "Virgil G") in Elonka Dunin (2006). The Mammoth Book of Secret Codes And Cryptograms. Carroll & Graf. .
 Two articles in Markus Jakobsson, Steven Myers (2007) Phishing and Counter-Measures: Understanding the Increasing Problem of Electronic Identity Theft. Wiley-Interscience. .

See also 
 King of the Nerds (season 1)

References

External links 
 
 arXiv publications

 Binary Revolution webcast, 17 May 2005
 Santa Fe Institute talk

1983 births
American computer programmers
American technology writers
California Institute of Technology alumni
Indiana University alumni
Living people
Participants in American reality television series
Writers about computer security
Writers from Tuscaloosa, Alabama
University of Alabama alumni
People associated with Ethereum